The 1940–41 Serbian League (Serbian: 1940–41 Српска лига / 1940–41 Srpska liga) was first held after the formation of the Banovina of Croatia and the consequent withdrawal of Croatian and Slovenian based clubs from the Yugoslav First League.  As consequence, the clubs from the Vardar Banovina, Vrbas Banovina, Zeta Banovina, Morava Banovina Drina Banovina, and Danube Banovina competed together.

BSK Beograd was the league leader when the April War interrupted play. The league was organized by the Serbian Football Federation (Srpski loptački savez).

League

See also
Yugoslav First League
1940–41 Croatian First League
1940–41 Slovenian Republic League
Serbian SuperLiga
Serbian Football Championship
Serbian Football League (1940–1944)

External links
 League table at fkvojvodina.com

Serbian Football League (1940–1944) seasons
Serbia
Serbia
Football
Football